Kincardine (Ellsi Field) Airport  is located  east of Kincardine, Ontario, Canada.

See also
 Kincardine Airport
 Kincardine/Shepherd's Landing Airport

References

Kincardine, Ontario
Defunct airports in Ontario